The FIL European Luge Championships 1998 took place in Oberhof, Germany for the second time having hosted the event previously in 1979.

Men's singles

Women's singles

Men's doubles

Mixed team

Medal table

References
Men's doubles European champions
Men's singles European champions
Mixed teams European champions
Women's singles European champions

FIL European Luge Championships
Sport in Oberhof, Germany
1998 in luge
Luge in Germany
1998 in German sport